David McKee Breeden (19 July 1946 Fort Worth, Texas – 22 June 2005 Belmont, California) was an American clarinetist who was the principal clarinetist with the San Francisco Symphony for 25 years. In addition to performing with the San Francisco Symphony, Breeden had taught at Stanford University and the San Francisco Conservatory of Music.  He performed for several years with the U.S. Navy Band.

A native of Fort Worth, Texas, he had been a student of his father, Leon Breeden, clarinetist and renown pioneer in jazz education at the University of North Texas College of Music.  Breeden earned degrees from the University of North Texas (Bachelor of Music, 1968) and Catholic University. Breeden married Barbara J. Bernhard November 24, 1974, in San Mateo County, California.  They had three children.

References

University of North Texas College of Music alumni
Catholic University of America alumni
Stanford University Department of Music faculty
San Francisco Conservatory of Music faculty
1946 births
2005 deaths
American classical clarinetists
20th-century American musicians
20th-century classical musicians
People from Fort Worth, Texas
Classical musicians from California